Die Hesselbachs is a German radio play series. The series started in 1949 and was adapted for television in 1960. There was also a film Die Familie Hesselbach (1954) and its sequels.

The series deals with the experiences of the Hesselbach family, who ran a printing and publishing company in a fictitious town in Hesse.

Author and actor Wolf Schmidt dealt with current social issues. Thus the series in Germany was one of the most successful television series of its time.

References

See also
 Die Firma Hesselbach
 List of German television series

German radio dramas
1949 radio dramas
Hessischer Rundfunk
Radio programs adapted into television shows
Radio programs adapted into films